The Mehler kernel is a complex-valued function found to be the propagator of the quantum harmonic oscillator.

Mehler's formula 
 defined a function

and showed, in modernized notation, that it can be expanded in terms of Hermite polynomials (.) based on weight function exp(−²) as

This result is useful, in modified form, in quantum physics, probability theory, and harmonic analysis.

Physics version 
In physics, the fundamental solution, (Green's function), or propagator of the Hamiltonian for the quantum harmonic oscillator is called the Mehler kernel.  It provides the fundamental solution---the most general solution    to 

The orthonormal eigenfunctions of the operator  are the Hermite functions,

with corresponding eigenvalues (2+1), furnishing particular solutions
 

The general solution is then a linear combination of these; when fitted to the initial condition , the general solution reduces to
 
where the kernel  has the separable representation

Utilizing Mehler's formula then yields 

When  = 0, variables  and  coincide, resulting in the limiting formula necessary by the initial condition,

As a fundamental solution, the kernel is additive,

This is further related to the symplectic rotation structure of the kernel  .

When using the usual physics conventions of defining the quantum harmonic oscillator instead via 

and assuming natural length and energy scales, then the  Mehler kernel becomes the Feynman propagator  which reads

i.e.  

multiplied by  an extra   Maslov phase factor 

When  the general solution is proportional to the Fourier transform   of the initial conditions  since 
  
and the exact Fourier transform is thus obtained from the quantum harmonic oscillator's number operator written as 
 
since the resulting kernel 
 

Probability version 
The result of Mehler can also be linked  to probability. (with weight function exp(−2)) to "probabilist's" Hermite polynomials (.) (with weight function exp(−2/2)). Then,  becomes

The left-hand side here is p(x,y)/p(x)p(y) where p(x,y) is the   bivariate Gaussian probability density function for variables  having zero means and unit variances: 

There follows the usually quoted form of the result (Kibble 1945)

This may be expanded as

The Inverse Fourier transform then immediately yields the above expansion formula.

This result can be extended to the multidimensional case.

Fractional Fourier transform

Since Hermite functions  are orthonormal eigenfunctions of the Fourier transform,
 
in harmonic analysis and signal processing, they diagonalize the Fourier operator,

Thus, the continuous generalization for  real angle  can be readily defined (Wiener, 1929;  Condon,  1937),  the fractional Fourier transform (FrFT), with kernel

The Mehler formula,  for  = exp(−i),  thus directly provides

The square root is defined such that the argument of the result lies in the interval [−π /2, π /2].

See also
 
 Heat kernel
 Hermite polynomials
 Parabolic cylinder functions
 

References

 Nicole Berline, Ezra Getzler, and Michèle Vergne (2013). Heat Kernels and Dirac Operators,  (Springer: Grundlehren Text Editions) Paperback  
 
 H. M. Srivastava and J. P. Singhal (1972). "Some extensions of the Mehler formula", Proc. Amer. Math. Soc.''  31: 135–141. (online)

Parabolic partial differential equations
Orthogonal polynomials
Mathematical physics
Multivariate continuous distributions